The Uttama Seva Padakkama (USP, Eminent Service Medal) (Sinhala: උත්තම සේවා පදක්කම uṭṭama sēvā padakkama) is presented to all ranks of the regular forces of the Sri Lankan military for:

Award process
The decoration is awarded at the National Day parade by the President after a recommendation and review process. Recipients can use the post-nominal letters "USP".

References

External links
Sri Lanka Army
Sri Lanka Navy
Sri Lanka Air Force
Ministry of Defence : Sri Lanka

Military awards and decorations of Sri Lanka
Awards established in 1981